Larry Weise is a former American basketball coach and athletic director. Weise was the head basketball coach at St. Bonaventure University from 1961 to 1973, compiling an overall record of 202–90, and leading the Brown Indians to an NCAA final Four appearance in 1970. He later served as athletic director for St. Bonaventure from 1973 to 1992. Weise was elected to the Greater Buffalo Sports Hall of Fame in 2002.

Head coaching record

See also
 List of NCAA Division I Men's Final Four appearances by coach

References

Year of birth uncertain
Living people
American men's basketball coaches
American men's basketball players
College men's basketball head coaches in the United States
St. Bonaventure Bonnies athletic directors
St. Bonaventure Bonnies men's basketball coaches
St. Bonaventure Bonnies men's basketball players
Year of birth missing (living people)